The Curse may refer to:

Film and television 
 The Curse (1924 film), a 1924 Austrian silent film directed by Robert Land
 The Curse (1987 film), a 1987 horror film adaptation of H. P. Lovecraft's The Colour Out of Space directed by David Keith
 Noroi: The Curse (2005 film), a 2005 J-Horror, "found footage" film in the form of a documentary
 The Curse (Stargate SG-1), an episode of Stargate SG-1
 The Curse, an episode of The Amazing World Of Gumball
 The Curse (British TV series), a 2022 comedy drama
 The Curse (American TV series),

Literature 
The Curse (Angel comic), a trade paperback collecting comic stories based on the Angel television series
"The Curse" (short story), a 1953 short story by Arthur C. Clarke
"The Curse" (Dubus story), a 1988 short story by Albert Dubus
The Curse: Cubs Win! Cubs Win! Or Do They?

Music 
The Curse (Atreyu album), 2004
The Curse (E-Force album), 2014
The Curse (Omen album), 1986
 "The Curse", a song by Audioslave from Out of Exile
 "The Curse", a song by Disturbed from Indestructible